Družina (meaning Family in English) is a Slovenian weekly Roman Catholic magazine.

History and profile
Družina was launched as a biweekly magazine in 1952; since 1998 there has also been an online version. Its publisher is the Roman Catholic Church in Slovenia. The magazine later began to be published weekly.

At the beginning of the 2000s Družina published articles against single-parent families and same-sex families.

According to the National Research on Readership, in 2010 Družina was read weekly by 97,000 people.

See also
 List of magazines in Slovenia

References

1952 establishments in Yugoslavia
Biweekly magazines
Catholic magazines
Magazines established in 1952
Magazines published in Slovenia
Slovene-language magazines
Weekly magazines
Magazines published in Yugoslavia
Eastern Bloc mass media